Alan Newman is an American serial entrepreneur based in the U.S. state of Vermont, who co-founded Gardener's Supply Company, Seventh Generation Inc., Magic Hat Brewing Company, and Alchemy & Science, Boston Beer Company's “incubator business.”

Life and career 
Originally from Long Island, New York, Newman spent a year at Parsons College in Iowa before dropping out and moving to the Haight-Ashbury district of San Francisco. Newman returned home, enrolled in Long Island University in Southampton and graduated on the deans list after recovering from an encounter with police where he was caught with a small amount of pills and marijuana.
Newman then moved to Burlington, Vermont, in 1970, after living on a commune in Oregon.

Newman's business career as an entrepreneur began in 1983, when he helped found Gardener's Supply Company with his friend Will Raap. He co-founded Seventh Generation Inc. in 1988, but was later forced out amid business difficulties in 1992. In 1994 he co-founded Magic Hat Brewing Company and served as CEO, before leaving in 2010. In 2011, Newman was recruited by Boston Beer Company's chairman Jim Koch to run Alchemy & Science, a subsidiary devoted to developing new beer lines for the company. Newman developed brands such as Traveler Beer Company, a line of shandies; Coney Island Brewery; Concrete Beach Brewery; and Angel City Brewery. Newman authored a book, High on Business: The Life, Times, and Lessons of a Serial Entrepreneur, in 2011, which includes a foreword and afterword by friends Ben Cohen and Jerry Greenfield, of Ben & Jerry's Ice Cream. On January 25, 2016, Newman bought out the co-founder of Higher Ground Nightclub, a nightclub in the Burlington, Vermont area that has operated since 1998. He also serves on the steering committee of the Vermont Cannabis Collaborative, an organization supporting the development of the Vermont cannabis industry. He has a daughter, Zoë.

References

 
 
 

Living people
Place of birth missing (living people)
Businesspeople from Vermont
People from Burlington, Vermont
1947 births
People from Long Island